Darren Steven Adams (born 12 January 1974) is an English former professional footballer who played in the Football League as a forward.

Career

After making a couple of appearances for Cray Wanderers, Adams was playing for Cray's Kent League rivals Danson Furness when he was offered a contract with Cardiff City in January 1994. He made his debut soon after in a 0–0 draw with Barnet on 22 January as a substitute in place of Tony Bird. He was handed a start in the club's following game and scored his first goal during a 5–1 victory over Wrexham. He played a total of 34 league games for the club, in several different positions, but fell out of favour in 1996 and was loaned out to Woking before being released at the end of the season.

He joined Aldershot Town, making his debut against Bognor Regis Town in August 1996. Adams spent seven months at the Recreation Ground before Dover Athletic paid £3,000 to sign him in February 1997.

References
General
 . Retrieved 28 October 2013.
Specific

External links

1974 births
Living people
Footballers from Bromley
English footballers
Association football forwards
Cray Wanderers F.C. players
Cardiff City F.C. players
Woking F.C. players
Aldershot Town F.C. players
Dover Athletic F.C. players
Hampton & Richmond Borough F.C. players
Welling United F.C. players
Fisher Athletic F.C. players
Erith & Belvedere F.C. players
English Football League players